The International School of Tianjin (IST) is an international school in Jinnan District, Tianjin.

The school was founded in 1994. IST uses the IB PYP (IB Primary Years Programme) until grade 5, IB MYP (IB Middle Years Programme) until grade 10 and the IB DP (IB Diploma Programme) from grades 11 to 12. The school provides education from Nursery to grade 12.

Student body
IST's student body consists of over 450 students from 32 countries.

Teachers
IST currently has over 70 teachers recruited internationally.

References

External links

International schools in Tianjin
Private schools in China
International Baccalaureate schools in China
Association of China and Mongolia International Schools
Educational institutions established in 1994
1994 establishments in China